Talalar is a village and municipality in the Balakan Rayon of Azerbaijan.  It has a population of 5,028.  The municipality consists of the villages of Talalar, Bayrambinə, and Hetovlar.

References 

Populated places in Balakan District